The 2010 WDF Europe Cup was the 17th edition of the WDF Europe Cup darts tournament, organised by the World Darts Federation. It was held in Kemer, Turkey from 13–17 October 2010.



Entered team
29 countries/associations entered a men's selection in the event.

27 countries/associations entered a women's selection in the event.

Men's singles

Men's pairs
{{64TeamBracket|seeds=no

| RD1         = 
| RD2         = 
| RD3         = 
| RD4         = 
| RD5         = 
| RD6         = 

| team-width  =200

| RD1-team01  = Martin Adams Scott Waites
| RD1-score01 =4
| RD1-team02  = Dylan Dup  John Duo 
| RD1-score02 =3
| RD1-team03  = Kyriakos Anastasiadis Emmanouil Vichos
| RD1-score03 =0
| RD1-team04  = Renaud Lescure Michel Boulet
| RD1-score04 =4
| RD1-team05  = Kim Huybrechts Ronny Huybrechts
| RD1-score05 =4
| RD1-team06  = Martin McCloskey Sean McGowan
| RD1-score06 =3
| RD1-team07  = Mike Veitch John Henderson
| RD1-score07 =4
| RD1-team08  = Laszlo Kadar Vlad-Christian Popa
| RD1-score08 =2
| RD1-team09  = Osvaldas Ksanys Arūnas Čiplys
| RD1-score09 =1
| RD1-team10  = Bac Ales Leopold Slanic
| RD1-score10 =4
| RD1-team11  = Marcin Koziarek Marek Kubowicz
| RD1-score11 =4
| RD1-team12  = Radivoj Bezbradica Branko Grba
| RD1-score12 =0
| RD1-team13  = Michael Mansell John Elder
| RD1-score13 =4
| RD1-team14  = Tarmo Putsepp Mati Leis
| RD1-score14 =0
| RD1-team15  = Marko Puls Kevin Münch
| RD1-score15 =
| RD1-team16  =Bye
| RD1-score16 =
| RD1-team17  = Wayne Warren Martin Phillips
| RD1-score17 =4
| RD1-team18  = Darren Olivero  George Federico 
| RD1-score18 =0
| RD1-team19  =
| RD1-score19 =2
| RD1-seed20  =
| RD1-team20  = Robert Wagner Thor-Helmer Johansen
| RD1-score20 =4
| RD1-seed21  = 
| RD1-team21  = Frede Johansen Glenn Honore
| RD1-score21 =4
| RD1-seed22  =
| RD1-team22  = Einar Moller Aegir Bjornsson
| RD1-score22 =0
| RD1-seed23  = 
| RD1-team23  = Jaakko Kiiski Petri Korte
| RD1-score23 =4
| RD1-seed24  =
| RD1-team24  = Roman Bleistein Pascal Barbezat
| RD1-score24 =3
| RD1-seed25  = 
| RD1-team25  = Loris Polese Luigi Marino
| RD1-score25 =1
| RD1-seed26  =
| RD1-team26  = Utku Karaca Engin Kayaoglu
| RD1-score26 =4
| RD1-seed27  = 
| RD1-team27  = Imants Nikolajevs Janis Armanovics
| RD1-score27 =0
| RD1-seed28  =
| RD1-team28  = Christoph Kleindienst Rene Jorgensen
| RD1-score28 =4
| RD1-seed29  = 
| RD1-team29  = Willy van de Wiel Joey ten Berge
| RD1-score29 =4
| RD1-seed30  =
| RD1-team30  = Michal Ondo Jiri Jenicek
| RD1-score30 =0
| RD1-seed31  = 
| RD1-team31  = Daniel Larsson Magnus Caris''
| RD1-score31 =
| RD1-seed32  =
| RD1-team32  =Bye
| RD1-score32 =
| RD1-seed33  = 
| RD1-team33  = Ewan Hyslop Ross Montgomery| RD1-score33 =
| RD1-seed34  =
| RD1-team34  =Bye
| RD1-score34 =
| RD1-seed35  = 
| RD1-team35  = Colin Rice Swen Seifert
| RD1-score35 =1
| RD1-seed36  =
| RD1-team36  = Tony O'Shea Darryl Fitton| RD1-score36 =4| RD1-seed37  = 
| RD1-team37  = Claudio Dolcetti Danilo Vigato
| RD1-score37 =1
| RD1-seed38  =
| RD1-team38  = Patryk Zabka Krzysztof Galus| RD1-score38 =4| RD1-seed39  = 
| RD1-team39  = Antonio Jimenez-Cabrera Casiano Paniagua-Palma| RD1-score39 =4| RD1-seed40  =
| RD1-team40  = Thomas Bremgartner Urs Von Rufs
| RD1-score40 =3
| RD1-seed41  = 
| RD1-team41  = Vegar Elvevoll Øyvind Aasland| RD1-score41 =4| RD1-seed42  =
| RD1-team42  = Claudius-Bert Kuvi Daniel Racoveanu
| RD1-score42 =2
| RD1-seed43  = 
| RD1-team43  = Vladimir Pavkovic Oliver Ferenc
| RD1-score43 =0
| RD1-seed44  =
| RD1-team44  = Paddy Meaney Stephen McDonnell| RD1-score44 =4| RD1-seed45  = 
| RD1-team45  = Kurt van de Rijck Geert De Vos| RD1-score45 =4| RD1-seed46  =
| RD1-team46  = David Miklas Miroslav Slusarcik
| RD1-score46 =3
| RD1-seed47  = 
| RD1-team47  = Alireza Ghafouri Franz Thaler| RD1-score47 =
| RD1-seed48  =
| RD1-team48  =Bye
| RD1-score48 =
| RD1-seed49  = 
| RD1-team49  = Stig Jorgensen Vladimir Andersen| RD1-score49 =
| RD1-seed50  =
| RD1-team50  =Bye
| RD1-score50 =
| RD1-seed51  = 
| RD1-team51  = Eser Tekin Emre Toros
| RD1-score51 =2
| RD1-seed52  =
| RD1-team52  = Orjan Thomsson Dennis Nilsson| RD1-score52 =4| RD1-seed53  = 
| RD1-team53  = Barry Copeland Gary Elliot| RD1-score53 =4| RD1-seed54  =
| RD1-team54  = Joze Vautar Mitja Habijan
| RD1-score54 =3
| RD1-seed55  = 
| RD1-team55  = Kaido Poldma Kristo Mannik
| RD1-score55 =3
| RD1-seed56  =
| RD1-team56  = Leonidas Smirinenka Tomas Sakys| RD1-score56 =4| RD1-seed57  = 
| RD1-team57  = Richards Tomasickis Guntars Grebskis| RD1-score57 =4| RD1-seed58  =
| RD1-team58  = Ivar Jonsson Fridrik Diego
| RD1-score58 =1
| RD1-seed59  = 
| RD1-team59  = Stephen Cake Robert Hughes
| RD1-score59 =3
| RD1-seed60  =
| RD1-team60  = Cyril Blot Christian Demazure| RD1-score60 =4| RD1-seed61  = 
| RD1-team61  = Rick Hofstra Cor Ernst| RD1-score61 =4| RD1-seed62  =
| RD1-team62  = Stathis Pantelidis Kostas Pantelidis
| RD1-score62 =1
| RD1-seed63  = 
| RD1-team63  = Ulf Ceder Vesa Nuutinen| RD1-score63 =
| RD1-seed64  =
| RD1-team64  =Bye
| RD1-score64 =

| RD2-seed01  = 
| RD2-team01  = Martin Adams Scott Waites| RD2-score01 =4| RD2-seed02  =
| RD2-team02  = Renaud Lescure Michel Boulet
| RD2-score02 =1
| RD2-seed03  = 
| RD2-team03  = Kim Huybrechts Ronny Huybrechts| RD2-score03 =4| RD2-seed04  =
| RD2-team04  = Mike Veitch John Henderson
| RD2-score04 =2
| RD2-seed05  = 
| RD2-team05  = Bac Ales Leopold Slanic
| RD2-score05 =3
| RD2-seed06  =
| RD2-team06  = Marcin Koziarek Marek Kubowicz| RD2-score06 =4| RD2-seed07  = 
| RD2-team07  = Michael Mansell John Elder| RD2-score07 =4| RD2-seed08  =
| RD2-team08  = Marko Puls Kevin Münch
| RD2-score08 =1
| RD2-seed09  = 
| RD2-team09  = Wayne Warren Martin Phillips| RD2-score09 =4| RD2-seed10  =
| RD2-team10  = Robert Wagner Thor-Helmer Johansen
| RD2-score10 =1
| RD2-seed11  = 
| RD2-team11  = Frede Johansen Glenn Honore
| RD2-score11 =2
| RD2-seed12  =
| RD2-team12  = Jaakko Kiiski Petri Korte| RD2-score12 =4| RD2-seed13  = 
| RD2-team13  = Utku Karaca Engin Kayaoglu| RD2-score13 =4| RD2-seed14  =
| RD2-team14  = Christoph Kleindienst Rene Jorgensen
| RD2-score14 =1
| RD2-seed15  = 
| RD2-team15  = Willy van de Wiel Joey ten Berge| RD2-score15 =4| RD2-seed16  =
| RD2-team16  = Daniel Larsson Magnus Caris
| RD2-score16 =2
| RD2-seed17  = 
| RD2-team17  = Ewan Hyslop Ross Montgomery
| RD2-score17 =1
| RD2-seed18  =
| RD2-team18  = Tony O'Shea Darryl Fitton| RD2-score18 =4| RD2-seed19  = 
| RD2-team19  = Patryk Zabka Krzysztof Galus
| RD2-score19 =2
| RD2-seed20  =
| RD2-team20  = Antonio Jimenez-Cabrera Casiano Paniagua-Palma| RD2-score20 =4| RD2-seed21  = 
| RD2-team21  = Vegar Elvevoll Øyvind Aasland| RD2-score21 =4| RD2-seed22  =
| RD2-team22  = Paddy Meaney Stephen McDonnell
| RD2-score22 =3
| RD2-seed23  = 
| RD2-team23  = Kurt van de Rijck Geert De Vos| RD2-score23 =4| RD2-seed24  =
| RD2-team24  = Alireza Ghafouri Franz Thaler
| RD2-score24 =1
| RD2-seed25  = 
| RD2-team25  = Stig Jorgensen Vladimir Andersen
| RD2-score25 =3
| RD2-seed26  =
| RD2-team26  = Orjan Thomsson Dennis Nilsson| RD2-score26 =4| RD2-seed27  = 
| RD2-team27  = Barry Copeland Gary Elliot| RD2-score27 =4| RD2-seed28  =
| RD2-team28  = Leonidas Smirinenka Tomas Sakys
| RD2-score28 =2
| RD2-seed29  = 
| RD2-team29  = Richards Tomasickis Guntars Grebskis
| RD2-score29 =1
| RD2-seed30  =
| RD2-team30  = Cyril Blot Christian Demazure| RD2-score30 =4| RD2-seed31  = 
| RD2-team31  = Rick Hofstra Cor Ernst| RD2-score31 =4| RD2-seed32  =
| RD2-team32  = Ulf Ceder Vesa Nuutinen
| RD2-score32 =3

| RD3-seed01  = 
| RD3-team01  = Martin Adams Scott Waites| RD3-score01 =4| RD3-seed02  =
| RD3-team02  = Kim Huybrechts Ronny Huybrechts
| RD3-score02 =1
| RD3-seed03  = 
| RD3-team03  = Marcin Koziarek Marek Kubowicz
| RD3-score03 =3
| RD3-seed04  =
| RD3-team04  = Michael Mansell John Elder| RD3-score04 =4| RD3-seed05  = 
| RD3-team05  = Wayne Warren Martin Phillips| RD3-score05 =4| RD3-seed06  =
| RD3-team06  = Jaakko Kiiski Petri Korte
| RD3-score06 =1
| RD3-seed07  = 
| RD3-team07  = Utku Karaca Engin Kayaoglu
| RD3-score07 =1
| RD3-seed08  =
| RD3-team08  = Willy van de Wiel Joey ten Berge| RD3-score08 =4| RD3-seed09  = 
| RD3-team09  = Tony O'Shea Darryl Fitton| RD3-score09 =4| RD3-seed10  =
| RD3-team10  = Antonio Jimenez-Cabrera Casiano Paniagua-Palma
| RD3-score10 =0
| RD3-seed11  = 
| RD3-team11  = Vegar Elvevoll Øyvind Aasland
| RD3-score11 =3
| RD3-seed12  =
| RD3-team12  = Kurt van de Rijck Geert De Vos| RD3-score12 =4| RD3-seed13  = 
| RD3-team13  = Orjan Thomsson Dennis Nilsson
| RD3-score13 =1
| RD3-seed14  =
| RD3-team14  = Barry Copeland Gary Elliot| RD3-score14 =4| RD3-seed15  = 
| RD3-team15  = Cyril Blot Christian Demazure
| RD3-score15 =0
| RD3-seed16  =
| RD3-team16  = Rick Hofstra Cor Ernst| RD3-score16 =4| RD4-seed01  = 
| RD4-team01  = Martin Adams Scott Waites| RD4-score01 =4| RD4-seed02  =
| RD4-team02  = Michael Mansell John Elder
| RD4-score02 =0
| RD4-seed03  = 
| RD4-team03  = Wayne Warren Martin Phillips| RD4-score03 =4| RD4-seed04  =
| RD4-team04  = Willy van de Wiel Joey ten Berge
| RD4-score04 =2
| RD4-seed05  = 
| RD4-team05  = Tony O'Shea Darryl Fitton| RD4-score05 =4| RD4-seed06  =
| RD4-team06  = Kurt van de Rijck Geert De Vos
| RD4-score06 =3
| RD4-seed07  = 
| RD4-team07  = Barry Copeland Gary Elliot
| RD4-score07 =2
| RD4-seed08  =
| RD4-team08  = Rick Hofstra Cor Ernst| RD4-score08 =4| RD5-seed01  = 
| RD5-team01  = Martin Adams Scott Waites| RD5-score01 =5| RD5-seed02  =
| RD5-team02  = Wayne Warren Martin Phillips
| RD5-score02 =3
| RD5-seed03  = 
| RD5-team03  = Tony O'Shea Darryl Fitton| RD5-score03 =5| RD5-seed04  =
| RD5-team04  = Rick Hofstra Cor Ernst
| RD5-score04 =2

| RD6-seed01  = 
| RD6-team01  = Martin Adams Scott Waites| RD6-score01 =6| RD6-seed02  =
| RD6-team02  = Tony O'Shea Darryl Fitton
| RD6-score02 =4
}}

Men's teamRound RobinGroup A 98  95  93 Group B 92  92  93  92  98  98 Group C 94  91  92  92  93  96 Group D 91  91  97 Group E 93  91  91 Group F 94  93  90  93  93  95 Group G 95  92  90  92  95  91 Group H 90  90  93 Knock OutWomen's singles

Women's pairsRound RobinGroup A Anna Forsmark & Carina Ekberg 42  Inge Van Genechten & Brigitte Smets
 Anna Forsmark & Carina Ekberg 41  Asli-Baris Tekin & Duygu Karaca
 Inge Van Genechten & Brigitte Smets 43  Asli-Baris Tekin & Duygu KaracaGroup B Caroline Breen & Christine Hunt 41  Daniela Piassoni & Ursula Binder
 Caroline Breen & Christine Hunt 41  Erika Bagdonaviciene & Ryte Banatiene
 Caroline Breen & Christine Hunt 40  Sigridur-Gudrun Jonsdottir & Petrea Fridriksdottir
 Daniela Piassoni & Ursula Binder 43  Erika Bagdonaviciene & Ryte Banatiene
 Daniela Piassoni & Ursula Binder 41  Sigridur-Gudrun Jonsdottir & Petrea Fridriksdottir
 Erika Bagdonaviciene & Ryte Banatiene 42  Sigridur-Gudrun Jonsdottir & Petrea FridriksdottirGroup C Veronica Simonsen & Marianne Halvorsen 40  Ewa Zabka & Malgorzara Storczyk
 Veronica Simonsen & Marianne Halvorsen 43  Radana Jandova & Marcela Melicharova
 Ewa Zabka & Malgorzara Storczyk 43  Radana Jandova & Marcela MelicharovaGroup D Susanna Young & Frances Lawson 40  Oana-Cristina Tapu & Daniela-Anca Comeaga
 Susanna Young & Frances Lawson 40  Katharina Von Rufs & Rose-Marie Bussard
 Oana-Cristina Tapu & Daniela-Anca Comeaga 43  Katharina Von Rufs & Rose-Marie BussardGroup E Trina Gulliver & Lisa Ashton 40  Alicia Sanchez-Anadon & Yolanda Salvo-Sierra
 Trina Gulliver & Lisa Ashton 41  Mette Funch & Christina Buchwald
 Alicia Sanchez-Anadon & Yolanda Salvo-Sierra 40  Mette Funch & Christina BuchwaldGroup F Karin Krappen & Francis Hoenselaar 43  Nicole Dillon & Denise Cassidy
 Karin Krappen & Francis Hoenselaar 40  Dorothee Lemaire & Carole Frison
 Karin Krappen & Francis Hoenselaar 40  Ligita Vilks & Vita Grebska
 Nicole Dillon & Denise Cassidy 42  Dorothee Lemaire & Carole Frison
 Nicole Dillon & Denise Cassidy 41  Ligita Vilks & Vita Grebska
 Dorothee Lemaire & Carole Frison 40  Ligita Vilks & Vita GrebskaGroup G Heike Ernst & Stefanie Lück 43  Tarja Salminen & Kirsi Viinikainen
 Heike Ernst & Stefanie Lück 41  Veleda Gaiga & Romanan Petrini
 Heike Ernst & Stefanie Lück 41  Giota Sfakioti & Maria Prompona
 Tarja Salminen & Kirsi Viinikainen 40  Veleda Gaiga & Romanan Petrini
 Tarja Salminen & Kirsi Viinikainen 40  Giota Sfakioti & Maria Prompona
 Veleda Gaiga & Romanan Petrini 43  Giota Sfakioti & Maria PromponaGroup H Julie Gore & Rhian Edwards 41  Viktorija Klanecek & Valerija Tasner
 Julie Gore & Rhian Edwards 40  Marija Bogunovic & Kristina Cikos
 Viktorija Klanecek & Valerija Tasner 43  Marija Bogunovic & Kristina CikosKnock Out'''

References

Darts tournaments